Black Dome Mountain is the northernmost summit of the Camelsfoot Range, which lies along the west side of the Fraser River, north of Lillooet, British Columbia, Canada. It is an ancient butte-like volcano located in the formation known as the Chilcotin Group, which lie between the Pacific Ranges of the Coast Mountains and the mid-Fraser River in British Columbia, Canada.

Location and terrain
It is the northernmost summit of the Camelsfoot Range, which lines the west bank of the Fraser north of Lillooet. The Churn Creek Protected Area adjoins the north and western flanks of the mountain, while the Fraser Canyon runs southward along its eastern flank.

Geology
Like other volcanic landforms in British Columbia, Black Dome Mountain is part of the Pacific Ring of Fire which includes over 160 active volcanoes.  There are obsidian deposits and other deposits around the volcano. It has produced olivine basalt dykes, lavas, and agglomerate. Black Dome Mountain is thought to have formed as a result of extension of the crust behind the Cascadia subduction zone and last erupted during the Pliocene.

History
During the early 1950s, Black Dome Mountain was the site of gold mining prospects by Bralorne Mines Inc. and produced a bit of an excitement for people that lived near the mountain.

See also
Anahim Volcanic Belt
Garibaldi Volcanic Belt
List of volcanoes in Canada
Volcanism of Canada
Volcanism of Western Canada

References

External links

Black Dome Mountain Volcanic History
Bubble Hot Spring
BC Govt MINFILE Mineral Inventory

Volcanoes of British Columbia
Two-thousanders of British Columbia
Landforms of the Chilcotin
Fraser Canyon
Eocene volcanoes
Pliocene volcanoes
Polygenetic volcanoes
Yale Division Yale Land District